In Western classical music, obbligato (also spelled obligato) usually describes a musical line that is in some way indispensable in performance. Its opposite is the marking ad libitum. It can also be used, more specifically, to indicate that a passage of music was to be played exactly as written, or only by the specified instrument, without changes or omissions. The word is borrowed from Italian (an adjective meaning mandatory; from Latin obligatus p.p. of obligare, to oblige); the spelling obligato is not acceptable in British English, but it is often used as an alternative spelling in the US. The word can stand on its own, in English, as a noun, or appear as a modifier in a noun phrase (e.g. organ obbligato).

Independence
Obbligato includes the idea of independence, as in C.P.E. Bach's 1780 Symphonies "mit zwölf obligaten Stimmen" ("with twelve obbligato parts") by which Bach was referring to the independent woodwind parts he was using for the first time. These parts were also obbligato in the sense of being indispensable.

Continuo
In connection with a keyboard part in the baroque period, obbligato has a very specific meaning: it describes a functional change from a basso continuo part (in which the player decided how to fill in the harmonies unobtrusively) to a fully written part of equal importance to the main melody part.

Contradictory usage
A later use has the contradictory meaning of optional, indicating that a part was not obligatory. A difficult passage in a concerto might be furnished by the editor with an easier alternative called the obbligato; or a work may have a part for one or more solo instruments, marked obbligato (but more commonly and correctly termed an ossia), that is decorative rather than essential; the piece is complete and can be performed without the added part. The traditional term for such a part is ad libitum, or ad lib., or simply optional, since ad lib. may have a wide variety of interpretations.

Contemporary usage
In classical music the term has fallen out of use by modern-day practitioners, as composers, performers and audiences alike have come to see the musical text as paramount in decisions of musical execution. As a result, everything is now seen as obbligato unless explicitly specified otherwise in the score. It is still used to denote an orchestral piece with an instrumental solo part that stands out, but is not as prominent as in a solo concerto, as in Bloch's Concerto Grosso mentioned below. The term is now used mainly to discuss music of the past. One contemporary usage, however, is that by Erik Satie in the third movement of "Embryons desséchés" ("Desiccated Embryos"), where the obbligato consists of around twenty F-major chords played at fortissimo (this is satirising Beethoven's symphonic style).

The term is also used with an entirely different meaning, signifying a countermelody.

Examples

Explicit instances
J.S. Bach used organ obbligato to show at a glance the importance of the organ part (in for example cantata Wer sich selbst erhöhet, der soll erniedriget werden, BWV 47 and cantata Gott ist mein König, BWV 71).
Mozart marks "cello obligato" in Don Giovanni in Zerlina's aria "".
Beethoven's duo for viola and cello, WoO 32, is subtitled "" ("with two [pairs of] obbligato eyeglasses") which seems to refer to the necessity, at the first performance, of spectacles for both Beethoven and his cellist.
Niels Gade's Fifth Symphony (1852) contains an obbligato piano part.
Camille Saint-Saëns's famous symphonic poem Danse Macabre features an obbligato violin.
John Philip Sousa's march "The Stars and Stripes Forever" contains a piccolo obbligato in its grandioso.
Ernest Bloch's 1925 Concerto Grosso No. 1 for string orchestra with piano obbligato is a neoclassical composition with 20th-century modal harmonies.
John Cage's Solo with Obbligato Accompaniment of Two Voices in Canon, and Six Short Inventions on the Subject of the Solo (1934, 1958)
Malcolm Arnold's A Grand, Grand Overture, Op. 57 (1956) is a 20th-century parody of the late 19th century concert overture, and contains obbligato parts for four rifles, three Hoover vacuum cleaners (two uprights in B, one horizontal with detachable sucker in C), and an electric floor polisher in E
Benjamin Britten's 1958 Nocturne for tenor, 7 obligato instruments & strings in which the tenor soloist is accompanied by one or more obbligato instruments in each of the eight movements (apart from the first)
Hector Berlioz's Harold en Italie contains an extensive part for viola obbligato

Implicit instances
Trumpet obbligato in J.S. Bach's cantata Jauchzet Gott in allen Landen, BWV 51
A horn obbligato during Sifare's aria, "", in W. A. Mozart's opera Mitridate, re di Ponto (1770)
In Mozart's Die Entführung aus dem Serail (1782) there are obbligati for flute, oboe, violin and cello.
In Mozart's La clemenza di Tito (1791) there are two arias with obbligato clarinet; basset clarinet obbligato "" (sung by Sesto) and Basset horn obbligato "" (sung by Vitellia).
Piano obbligato in Mozart's concert aria "Ch'io mi scordi di te? ... Non temer, amato bene" (K. 505)
Piano obbligato in Rued Langgaard's Third Symphony, "The Flush of Youth – La Melodia"
Horn obbligato aria Abscheulicher!/Komm Hoffnung in Beethoven's opera Fidelio
Bassoon obbligato in the Quid Sum Miser of Verdi's Requiem.
An especially ornate violin obbligato appears in the Benedictus of Ludwig van Beethoven's Missa solemnis
Corno (horn) obbligato in Gustav Mahler's Symphony No. 5
Prominent obbligato writing for flute in particular is not unusual in Romantic opera, for example in the cadenza of the traditional version of the Mad Scene in Lucia di Lammermoor (1835)
Bass clarinet obbligato in the third movement of Morton Gould's Latin American Symphonette
Clarinet obbligato in Porter Steele's High Society (1901), added by Alphonse Picou
Piano obbligato in the third movement of Frederik Magle's symphonic suite Cantabile (2009)

References

Accompaniment
Musical terminology